The 1995 US Open was a tennis tournament played on outdoor hard courts at the USTA National Tennis Center in New York City in New York in the United States. It was the 115th edition of the US Open and was held from August 28 to September 10, 1995.

This marked the first Grand Slam main draw appearance for Bob and Mike Bryan, who would go on to win 16 Grand Slam titles together, including five US Open titles in 2005, 2008, 2010, 2012, and 2014.

Seeds
Champion seeds are indicated in bold text while text in italics indicates the round in which those seeds were eliminated.

Draw

Finals

Top half

Section 1

Section 2

Bottom half

Section 3

Section 4

Qualifying
The qualifying rounds for the 1995 US Open were played in late August 1995 at the USTA National Tennis Center in Flushing Meadows, New York City, United States.

This event marks the only participation of Marcelo Ríos (who eventually became world No. 1 in singles in 1998) at a doubles competition of any Grand Slam tournament. Ríos teamed up with Sjeng Schalken, losing in the final round against Roger Smith and Paul Wekesa. The pair would also win an ATP tournament in Amsterdam at the same year, which would be the only title of Ríos in his entire doubles career.

Seeds

Qualifiers

Lucky losers
  Stefan Kruger /  Christo van Rensburg

Qualifying draw

First qualifier

Second qualifier

Third qualifier

Fourth qualifier

References

External links
 Main draw
1995 US Open – Men's draws and results at the International Tennis Federation

Men's Doubles
US Open (tennis) by year – Men's doubles